Jermaine Eluemunor (born 13 December 1994) is an American football offensive tackle for the Las Vegas Raiders of the National Football League (NFL). He played college football at Texas A&M and high school football for Morris Knolls High School in Denville, New Jersey.

Early years
Eluemunor was born to a Nigerian father and English mother in Chalk Farm, London. He attended Haverstock School. Growing up, he played rugby and cricket. He became interested in American football after watching the 2007 Miami Dolphins-New York Giants game on television. The game was played at Wembley Stadium in London as part of the NFL International Series.

Eluemunor moved to the United States with his father at age 14, when he started playing American football at Morris Knolls High School near Denville, New Jersey. At Morris Knolls, he played football and wrestled. He played on the defensive and offensive lines in football. As a senior wrestler, he recorded a 30–7 record.

During his sophomore year of high school, Eluemunor returned to London with his father. He begged his father to return to the United States, and his father agreed, on the condition he graduate from university and maximize his potential in American football.

College career
Out of high school, Eluemunor was not recruited by any college football programs. He attended Lackawanna College in Scranton, PA from 2012 to 2013. In 2013 he made the all-conference second-team.

After being recruited by 35 college programs, Eluemunor originally committed to UCLA, then flipped to Arkansas but then decommitted before committing to Texas A&M. Eluemunor attended Texas A&M from 2014 to 2016. He redshirted in 2014. In 2015, he was the backup right guard. He made his first career start during the 2015 Music City Bowl. In 2016, he started 12 of the 13 games, with three at right guard and nine at right tackle.

Eluemunor attributes his development in football to Texas A&M offensive line coach Jim Turner.

Professional career
At the 2017 NFL Combine, Eluemunor tied the second-highest number of reps in the 225-lb bench press with 34.

Baltimore Ravens
Eluemunor was drafted by the Baltimore Ravens in the fifth round (159th overall) in the 2017 NFL Draft. In his rookie season, Eluemunor saw action in eight games, starting two at right guard, and was named to the PFWA All-Rookie Team.

On 22 September 2018, Eluemunor was waived by the Ravens and was re-signed to the practice squad. He was promoted to the active roster on 23 October 2018. He was resigned as an exclusive rights free agent 15 April 2019.

New England Patriots
On 28 August 2019, Eluemunor and a sixth-round pick was traded to the New England Patriots for a 2020 fourth-round pick.

The Patriots re-signed Eluemunor to a one-year restricted free agent contract on 16 April 2020. He was named the starting right tackle to begin the 2020 season. He started four of the first five games before suffering an ankle injury in Week 6. He was placed on injured reserve on 21 October 2020. He was activated on 14 November 2020.

Miami Dolphins
On 14 June 2021, Eluemunor signed with the Miami Dolphins. He was released on August 24, 2021.

Jacksonville Jaguars
On August 28, 2021, Eluemunor signed with the Jacksonville Jaguars. He was released on August 31, 2021.

Las Vegas Raiders
On September 2, 2021, Eluemunor signed with the Las Vegas Raiders, ultimately starting three games that season. He re-signed with the team on March 25, 2022.

References

External links
Texas A&M Aggies bio

1994 births
Living people
English people of Nigerian descent
People from Denville, New Jersey
Players of American football from New Jersey
Sportspeople from Morris County, New Jersey
English players of American football
American football offensive tackles
American football offensive guards
Lackawanna Falcons football players
Texas A&M Aggies football players
Baltimore Ravens players
New England Patriots players
Miami Dolphins players
Jacksonville Jaguars players
Las Vegas Raiders players